Amin Taghizadeh (born 1994) is an Iranian football defender who plays for Gostaresh Foolad in the Persian Gulf Pro League.

Career statistics

References

 Amin Taghizadeh in Iran Pro League

Living people
Sportspeople from Tabriz
Iranian footballers
Association football defenders
Gostaresh Foulad F.C. players
1994 births